Plays to Please is an EP by Canadian musician Owen Pallett, under the name of their project Final Fantasy. It pays tribute to the songs of Toronto’s Alex Lukashevsky and Deep Dark United.

Track listing
"Horsetail Feathers" – 3:25
"Ultimatum" – 2:44
"Moodring Band" – 2:54
"I Saved a Junky Once" – 1:53
"Nun or a Bawd" – 2:42
"Crush-Love-Crush" – 4:56

Personnel

Leonie Wall - flute
Andrew Bird - whistling
Joe Orlowski - clarinet
Rob Carley - saxophone
Michael Fedyshyn - trumpet
David Pell - trombone
Owen Pallett - piano and celeste
Nick Fraser - drums
Ed Reifel - percussion
Paul Mathew - double bass
violins 
Bethany Bergman
Sandy Baron
Jeremy Bell
Drew Jurecka
Czaba Kozco
Aya Myagawa
Eric Paetkau
Nancy Kershaw
Rebecca Wolkstein
violas
Karen Moffatt
Kathleen Kajioka
Josh Greenlaw
cellos
John Marshman
Rebecca Morton
Amy Laing

References

Owen Pallett albums
2008 EPs